The 1995–96 ISU Champions Series Final was an elite figure skating competition held in Paris, France from February 23 through 25, 1996. Medals were awarded in men's singles, ladies' singles, pair skating, and ice dancing.

The Champions Series Final was the culminating event of the ISU Champions Series, which consisted of Skate America, Skate Canada International, Nations Cup, Trophée de France, and NHK Trophy. The top six skaters from each discipline competed in the final.

Results

Men

Ladies

Pairs

Ice dancing

External links
 Ice Skating International Online

1996 in figure skating
Grand Prix of Figure Skating Final
Grand Prix of Figure Skating Final
Grand Prix of Figure Skating Final
Figure skating in Paris